Guda Anjaiah (1 November 1955 – 21 June 2016) was an Indian poet, singer, lyricist, and writer from the state of Telangana.

Early life
Guda Anjaiah was born to Lakshmaiah and Laskhmamma in the Lingapuram village of the Dandepalli Mandal, Adilabad district in the year 1955. He was fifth one among the six brothers and a sister in the family. He attended his early schooling in the same village. Later, he completed intermediate studies in Laksettipeta and B.Pharmacy in Hyderabad. His father was educated and both the parents used to sing the tales of Ramayan, Mahabharata and other folk stories.

Personal life
He was a famous singer in Telangana state.

Popular culture
Guda Anjaiah, during his schooling wrote the first song Ooru idichi ney poduna, Uri eska sathunna which remarked on the society and drought in Telangana Region. After receiving a huge response from the people and well-known poets, he decided to write about the condition of people in Telangana. His writings and songs challenged the upper castes (Doras, Patels) in Telangana society.

At the age of 16 came his masterpiece, Ooru Manadira, which was first sung at Nalgonda in a meeting organised by the Arunodaya Organisation. It became a massive hit, was later translated into 16 other languages, and featured in the film Erra Sainyam directed by R. Narayana Murthy.

Telangana Agitation
Guda Anjaiah played a significant role in the Telangana agitation. Starting from 1969 Agitation, he was part of the movement. But in the later period of the agitation, he took the lead and toured all Telangana singing his powerful songs which motivated and energised the activists.

He along with Rasamayi Balakrishna started the event Telangana Dhoom Dham a cultural cum educating programme in the Kamareddy city. This event included lectures, speech and performance of various folk artists, singers, dancers and poets. Dhoom Dham was a huge hit and was organised in each and every village of Telangana. This event provided a platform for uniting the public, activists and political leaders under one tree.

His songs  Rajigo Ore Rajigo  (to motivate not to commit suicide in Telangana movement), Na Telangana, Na Telanagana .. Niluvella Gayala Veena,Ayyoniva Nuvvu Avvoniva Telanganoniki Thoti Paloniva (about Andhra settlers in Hyderabad) and others dominated Stage of Dhoom Dham. From 2001 to the achievement of Telangana State he fought, led and dictated the movement through his songs. His role in the Telangana Movement is highly appreciated and praised by Telangana.

Filmography

Other popular songs
Walekum salam walekum Police Anna
Nenu Rano Biddo Sarkar Dhawakana

Books
Polimera (Novel) 
Dalitha Kathalu (stories)
 Cinema Patalu

Awards
Sahithya Bandu Ratna award – 1986
Rajini Telugu Sahithi Samithi Award −1988
Ganda Pendera Title – 2000
Dr. Malaya Sri Sahithi Award −2004
Suddala Hanumanthu – Janakamma Award – 2015
Komuram Bheem National Award – 2015
Telangana Sahithya Puraskaram – 2015

Death
Guda Anjaiah (60 years) died of kidney ailment at his house in Raganna Guda village of Hayathnagar Mandal, Rangareddy District on 21 June 2016.

References

External links

- YouTube
Telangana writer Guda Anjaiah Exclusive Interview - V6 Telangana Animuthyalu (06-02-2015)
Namasthe Telangana e Paper | e Paper ntnews

1955 births
2016 deaths
Activists from Telangana
Telugu poets
Indian male folk singers